Sport Extra is a Romanian sports television, launched on 2 March 2020.

Sport competitions

Aquatics
 LEN Champions League

Basketball

 Copa del Rey de Baloncesto
 Liga ACB
 LNB Pro A
 Supercopa de España de Baloncesto

Cycling
 Giro d'Italia Femminile
 Tour of Romania

Darts
 Campionatul Național de Darts
 WDF World Cup

Football
 Eredivisie
 Saudi Professional League
 Saudi Super Cup
 Serie B

Ice hockey
 National League

Martial Arts 
 One Championship (ONE)
 Professional Fighters League (PFL)
 Boxxer
 Dynamite Fighting Show (DFS)
 KO Masters
 Ultimate Fighting Tournament (UFT)
 Senshi   
 Queensberry

Motor sport 
 AMC Racing
 Andros Trophy
 CNSR
 CNVC
 DTM
 Drone Champions League
 European Truck Racing Championship
 Formula Renault Eurocup
 Goodwood Festival of Speed 
 GT Intercontinental Challenge
 GT World Challenge America
 GT World Challenge Europe
 GT4 European Series
 GT-R Sprint Series
 IndyCar Series 
 Le Mans European Series
 Le Mans Cup  
 Motocross World Championship
 NASCAR
 New Zealand Jetsprint Championship
 Romanian Rally Championship 
 WeatherTech SportsCar Championship

Tennis
 United Cup
 World TeamTennis

References

External links
 Official website

Television stations in Romania
Television channels and stations established in 2020
Sports television in Romania
Sports television in the United States